Kamusi Airport is an airport in Kamusi, Papua New Guinea.

Airlines and destinations

References

Airports in Papua New Guinea